Alfred Graham  (September 27, 1905 – October 1969) was a guard  who played nine seasons in the National Football League, mainly for the Dayton Triangles . He was born in Miamisburg, Ohio and died in Dayton, Ohio.

Despite being a lineman, he twice scored touchdowns via fumble recoveries, once in 1927 and again in 1929 (this one capping the only scoring drive for the 0-6 Triangles).

1905 births
1969 deaths
American football offensive linemen
Dayton Triangles players
Portsmouth Spartans players
Providence Steam Roller players
Chicago Cardinals players